Post codes in Malta are seven-character strings that form part of a postal address in Malta. Post codes were first introduced in 1991 by the mail operator MaltaPost. Like those in the United Kingdom and Canada, they are alphanumeric.

Format 
Since 2007, Maltese post codes consist of three letters that differ by locality, and four numbers. For example, an address in the capital Valletta would have the following postcode:

Malta Chamber of Commerce
Exchange Buildings
Republic Street
Valletta VLT 1117

Exceptionally some postcodes begin with two letters - TP (Tigne Point).

Pre-2007 Format

In the previous format, the post codes consisted of three letters and two digits, written after the name of the locality.

Malta Chamber of Commerce
Exchange Buildings
Republic Street
Valletta VLT 05

Post Codes and Localities

These are the different post codes and the localities that use them:

ATD: Attard (including Ta' Qali)
BBG: Birżebbuġa (including Ħal Far, Kalafrana and Qajjenza)
BKR: Birkirkara (including Fleur-de-Lys, Mrieħel and Swatar)
BML: Bormla (Cospicua)
BRG: Birgu (Vittoriosa)
BZN: Balzan
DGL: Dingli
FGR: Fgura
FNT: Fontana
FRN: Floriana
GDJ: Gudja
GHR: Għargħur
GRB: Għarb
GSM: Għajnsielem
GSR: Għasri
GXQ: Għaxaq
GZR: Gżira (including Manoel Island)
HMR: Ħamrun
IKL: Iklin
ISL: Isla (Senglea)
KCM: Kerċem (including Santa Luċija)
KKP: Kirkop
KKR: Kalkara
KMN: Kemmuna (Comino)
LJA: Lija
LQA: Luqa (including Ħal Farruġ)
MDN: Mdina
MFN: Marsalforn
MGR: Mġarr (including part of Għajn Tuffieħa and Żebbiegħ)
MLH: Mellieħa (including Ċirkewwa, Għadira, part of Għajn Tuffieħa, Manikata and Marfa)
MQB: Mqabba
MRS: Marsa
MSD: Msida (including Swatar)
MSK: Marsaskala
MST: Mosta (including part of Bidnija)
MTF: Mtarfa
MTP: MaltaPost Marsa complex
MXK: Marsaxlokk
MXR: Munxar
NDR: Nadur
NXR: Naxxar (including Baħar iċ-Ċagħaq, Birguma, Magħtab, Salina and San Pawl tat-Tarġa)
PBK: Pembroke
PLA: Paola (Raħal Ġdid)
PTA: Pietà (including Gwardamanġa)
QLA: Qala
QRD: Qrendi
QRM: Qormi
RBT: Rabat (including Baħrija, Mtaħleb and Tal-Virtù)
SCM: SmartCity Malta
SFI: Safi
SGN: San Ġwann (including Kappara)
SGW: Siġġiewi
SLC: Santa Luċija
SLM: Sliema
TP: Tigne Point
SLZ: San Lawrenz
SNT: Sannat
SPB: Saint Paul's Bay (San Pawl il-Baħar) (including Buġibba, Burmarrad, part of Bidnija, Pwales, Qawra, San Martin, Wardija and Xemxija)
STJ: Saint Julians (San Ġiljan) (including Paceville)
SPK: Spinola Park
SVR: Santa Venera
SWQ: Swieqi (including Ibraġ and Madliena)
TXN: Tarxien
VCT: Victoria (Rabat)
VLT: Valletta
XBX: Ta' Xbiex
XJR: Xgħajra
XLN: Xlendi
XRA: Xagħra
XWK: Xewkija
ZBB: Żebbuġ, Gozo
ZBG: Żebbuġ, Malta
ZBR: Żabbar (including Saint Peters)
ZRQ: Żurrieq (including Bubaqra)
ZTN: Żejtun

References
 MaltaPost p.l.c. Post Code Enquiry 

Malta
Postal system of Malta